Candás is a small fishing village in Asturias, the north of Spain.

It is one of 12 parishes (administrative divisions) in Carreño, a municipality within the province and autonomous community of Asturias, in northern Spain.
 in size, with a population of 6500 (INE 2009). The postal code is 33430.

This seafaring village has many places of tourist interest, such as the Antón Museum of Sculpture, a multisports centre and outdoor places, like Baragaña Square, the pier and more.

On the pier is located one of the most notable ice-cream shops of Carreño, 'Helados Helio Hermanos'. Founded in 1944, it sells ice cream and hand-made "turrones".

References 

Parishes in Carreño